Haouch El Harimeh,  is a village located in the Western Beqaa District of the Beqaa Governorate in Lebanon.

History
In 1838, Eli Smith noted Haush Harimeh's population as being Sunni Muslim.

References

Bibliography

Further reading

External links
Haouch El Harimeh, localiban

Populated places in Western Beqaa District
Sunni Muslim communities in Lebanon